Nephelotus cristipennis is a species of beetle in the family Cerambycidae. It was described by Stephan von Breuning in 1954. It is known from Sumatra.

References

Lamiini
Beetles described in 1954